The Devil's Nest (Pirunpesä) is an eroded cavity located in the village Ylivalli in the municipality Jalasjärvi in Southern Ostrobothnia, Finland. It is 14 meters wide and 23 meters deep, and the deepest earth erosion in Europe.

Formation
The evolution of the Devil’s Nest can be explained in three stages: during the Tertiary period, the Ice Age and the present time. Clearly, it took over million years to turn into the way it is now. During Tertiary the area was very dry and vulnerable to erosion. The surface of the mountain was eroded many meters, forming an erosion layer. At the same time, a vertical cut was formed in the surface which was filled with eroded material. This was the first stage of the Devil’s Nest.

During the Ice Age period (about 2 million years ago) there have been 4 glacial events and between them, interglacial periods that were comparable to the present climate. These glaciers overrode the area several times, removing the eroded surface layer down to the bottom. The next glaciers have influenced the cavity and left different layers of granite and between them; sand and silt were accumulated during these periods. It was not until the end of last century when, through hard labor and much financial support, workers were able to remove all of the eroded materials. The hole was opened to the public by 1997.

Mythology
The name of the Devil's Nest is derived from the tales of those believed that the Devil had lived in the cavity.
Tourists can descend the stairs into the abyss. Next to the Devil’s Nest, there is a 21 meter high tower with an excellent view of the cavern and the surrounding area as well.

Location
Jalasjärvi is 36 km south of Seinäjoki. The easiest way is to arrive by car. The signs to get to Pirunpesä are clear, but there are not so many so it is important to read and follow them carefully. The cavity is open from the beginning of May until the end of August, every day from 12.00 to 20.00. During September is open only during weekends or special occasions.

References 

Canyons and gorges of Finland
Landforms of South Ostrobothnia
Kurikka